Yuma Murakami (born 12 December 1992) is a Japanese speed skater who is specialized in the sprint distances.

Career 
At the fifth competition weekend of the 2016–17 ISU Speed Skating World Cup, held in Berlin, Germany Murakami finished in second place in the first 500m event following Nico Ihle. At the second competition weekend of the 2018–19 ISU Speed Skating World Cup in Tomakomai, Japan he finished second in the first 500m event behind Tatsuya Shinhama and third in the second 500m.

Personal records

References

External links
 SpeedSkatingStats profile
 SpeedSkatingNews profile
 ISU biography
 Eurosport profile

1992 births
Living people
Japanese male speed skaters
People from Obihiro, Hokkaido
Speed skaters at the 2017 Asian Winter Games
Speed skaters at the 2022 Winter Olympics
Olympic speed skaters of Japan
21st-century Japanese people